Eoophyla dentisigna is a moth in the family Crambidae. It was described by David John Lawrence Agassiz in 2012. It is found in Cameroon, the Republic of the Congo and Sierra Leone.

The wingspan is 15–18 mm. The forewings are white, the basal half of the costa is brown. The base of the hindwings is white with a fuscous fascia and a yellow antemedian fascia, followed by a white area with fuscous scales. Adults have been recorded on wing in March and December.

References

Eoophyla
Moths described in 2012